The World Classical Network (WCN) is an internet-delivery classical radio broadcasting service owned by CCB Media in Hyannis, Massachusetts.  The service has been in existence since February 1998, when it was owned and operated by Charles River Broadcasting.  It filled a void left by the demise of the U. S. version of Classic FM, the classical music satellite service of SW Networks.

Stations
WCN programming is carried on Cape Cod Broadcasting's WFCC-FM, licensed to Chatham, Massachusetts. WFCC is the WCN flagship station. The service is also syndicated, with the following affiliates:

WCRI-FM/95.9 ("Classical 95.9") Block Island, Rhode Island
WSCS/90.9 ("Classical 90.9") New London, New Hampshire

Hosts
Current hosts on the World Classical Network include Mark Calder, Don Spencer, and Larry King. Longtime classical announcer Steve Murphy joined the WCN as morning host on September 16, 2008.

References

External links
Old official website
New official website

Internet radio stations in the United States
Classical music radio stations in the United States